A thalassocracy or thalattocracy sometimes also maritime empire, is a state with primarily maritime realms, an empire at sea, or a seaborne empire. Traditional thalassocracies seldom dominate interiors, even in their home territories. Examples of this were the Phoenician states of Tyre, Sidon and Carthage; the Italian maritime republics of Venice and Genoa of the Mediterranean; the Chola dynasty of Tamilakam in India; the Omani Empire of Arabia; and the Austronesian empires of Srivijaya and Majapahit in Maritime Southeast Asia. Thalassocracies can thus be distinguished from traditional empires, where a state's territories, though possibly linked principally or solely by the sea lanes, generally extend into mainland interiors in a tellurocracy ("land-based hegemony").

The term thalassocracy can also simply refer to naval supremacy, in either military or commercial senses. The Ancient Greeks first used the word thalassocracy to describe the government of the Minoan civilization, whose power depended on its navy. Herodotus distinguishes sea-power from land-power and spoke of the need to counter the Phoenician thalassocracy by developing a Greek "empire of the sea".

Its realization and ideological construct is called maritimism (as in the case of the Estado Novo), contrasting continentalism.

Origin of the Concept: Eusebius' List 

Thalassocracy was a resurrection of a word known from a very specific classical document, which British classical scholar John Linton Myres termed "the List of Thalassocracies". The list was in the Chronicon, a work of universal history of Eusebius, an early 4th century bishop of Caesarea Maritima. Eusebius categorized several historical polities in the Mediterranean as "sea-controlling", and listed them in a chronology.

The list includes a successive series of "thalassocracies", begins from the Lydians after the fall of Troy, and ends with Aegina, each controlled the sea for a number of years. The list therefore presents a series of the successive exclusive naval domains, as the total control of the seas changed hands between these thalassocracies.  Since it does not mention Aegina's final submission of its naval force to Athens, the original list was likely compiled before the consolidation of the Athenian-led Delian League.

Eusebius' list survived through fragments of Diodorus Siculus' works, while also appeared in 4th-century theologian and historian Jerome's Chronicon, and Byzantine chronicler George Syncellus' Extract of Chronography. German classical scholar Christian Gottlob Heyne reconstructed the list through fragments in 1771. The list was then further surveyed by John Myres in 1906-07 and extensively studied by Molly Miller in the 1970s.

History and examples of thalassocracies

Ancient and Classical Mediterranean 

The Greek list of successive thalassocracies begins from Lydians, then Pelasgians, then Thracians, then Rhodians, then Phrygians, then Cypriots, then Phoenicians, then Egyptians, then Milesians, then Lesbians, then Phocaeans, then Samians, then Spartans, then Naxians, then Eretrians, and finally Aeginetans. Since the list includes all the polities that once controlled the Eastern Mediterranean Sea exclusively, it also lists many polities that were not necessarily maritime-based or controlled maritime realms, such as Ancient Egypt and Sparta.

Ancient maritime-centered or seaborne powers in the Mediterranean include Phoenicians, Athens (Dalian League), Carthage, and to a lesser degree Aegina and Rhodes.

Indo-Pacific 

The Austronesian peoples of Maritime Southeast Asia developed the Indian Ocean's first true maritime trade network. They established trade routes with Southern India and Sri Lanka as early as 1500 BC, ushering in an exchange of material culture (like catamarans, outrigger boats, lashed-lug and sewn-plank boats, and paan) and cultigens (like coconuts, sandalwood, bananas, and sugarcane); as well as connecting the material cultures of India and China. Indonesians in particular traded in spices (mainly cinnamon and cassia) with East Africa, using catamaran and outrigger boats and sailing with the help of the Westerlies in the Indian Ocean. This trade network expanded west to Africa and the Arabian Peninsula, resulting in the Austronesian colonization of Madagascar by the first half of the first millennium AD. It continued into historic times, later becoming the Maritime Silk Road.

The first thalassocracies in the Indo-Pacific region began to emerge around the 2nd century AD, through the rise of emporia exploiting the prosperous trade routes between Funan and India through the Malacca Strait using advanced Austronesian sailing technologies. Numerous coastal city-states emerged, centered on trading ports built near or around river mouths which allowed easy access to goods from inland for maritime trade. These city-states established commercial networks with other trading centers in Southeast Asia and beyond. Their rulers also gradually Indianized by adopting the social structures and religions of India to consolidate their power.

The thalassocratic empire of Srivijaya emerged by the 7th century through conquest and subjugation of neighboring thalassocracies. These included Melayu, Kedah, Tarumanagara, and Mataram, among others. These polities controlled the sea lanes in Southeast Asia and exploited the spice trade of the Spice Islands, as well as maritime trade-routes between India and China. Srivijaya was in turn subjugated by Singhasari around 1275, before finally being absorbed by the successor thalassocracy of Majapahit (1293–1527).

Europe and the Mediterranean

Phoenicia and the Delian League were early examples of Mediterranean thalassocracies.

The Middle Ages saw multiple thalassocracies, often land-based empires which controlled areas of the sea, the best known of them were the Republic of Venice, the Republic of Genoa and the Republic of Pisa; the others were: the Duchy of Amalfi, the Republic of Ancona, the Republic of Ragusa, the Duchy of Gaeta and the Republic of Noli. They were known as maritime republics, controlling trade and territories in the Mediterranean Sea for centuries. These contacts were not only commercial, but also cultural and artistic. They also had an essential role in the Crusades.

The Venetian republic was conventionally divided in the fifteenth century into the Dogado of Venice and the Lagoon, the Stato di Terraferma of Venetian holdings in northern Italy, and the Stato da Màr of the Venetian outlands bound by the sea. According to the French historian Fernand Braudel, Venice was a scattered empire, a trading-post empire forming a long capitalist antenna.

From the 12th to the 15th century the Genoese Republic had the monopoly on the Western Mediterranean trade, establishing colonies and trading posts in numerous countries, and eventually came to control regions in the Black Sea as well. It was also one of the largest naval powers of Europe during the Late Middle Ages.

The Early Middle Ages ( 500–1000 AD) saw many of the coastal cities of Southern Italy develop into minor thalassocracies whose chief powers lay in their ports and in their ability to sail navies to defend friendly coasts and to ravage enemy ones. These include the  duchies of Gaeta and Amalfi.

During the 14th and 15th centuries, the Crown of Aragon was also a thalassocracy controlling a large portion of present-day eastern Spain, parts of what is now southern France and other territories in the Mediterranean. The extent of the Catalan language is a result of this; it's spoken in Alghero on Sardinia.

Transcontinental 

With the modern age, the Age of Exploration saw some transcontinental thalassocracies emerge. Anchored in their European territories, several nations established colonial empires held together by naval supremacy. First among them chronologically was the Portuguese Empire, followed soon by the Spanish Empire, which was challenged by the Dutch Empire, itself replaced on the high seas by the British Empire, which had large landed possessions held together by the greatest navy of its time. With naval arms-races (especially between Germany and Britain), the end of colonialism, and the winning of independence by many colonies, European thalassocracies, which had controlled the world's oceans for centuries, diminished—though Britain's power-projection in the Falklands War of 1982 demonstrated continuing thalassocratic clout.

The Ottoman Empire expanded from a land-based region to dominate the Eastern Mediterranean and to expand into the Indian Ocean as a thalassocracy from the 15th century AD.

List of historical thalassocracies

 Ajuran Sultanate
 Ancient Carthage
 British Empire
 Bruneian Sultanate (1368–1888) (Old Brunei)
 Champa
 Chola dynasty
 Crown of Aragon
 Dál Riata
 Delian League
 Demak Sultanate
 Denmark–Norway
 Doric Hexapolis
 Dutch Empire
 Empire of Japan
 Frisian Kingdom
 Hanseatic League
 Johor Sultanate
 Kedah
 Kediri Kingdom
 Kilwa Sultanate
 Kingdom of the Isles
 Liburnia
 Majapahit
 Malacca Sultanate
 Maritime republics
 Maynila
 Mataram Kingdom
 Melayu Kingdom
 Minoan civilization
 Muscat and Oman
 North Sea Empire
 Norwegian Empire
 Omani Empire
 Phoenicia
 Portuguese Empire
 Rajahnate of Butuan
 Rajahnate of Cebu
 Republic of Pirates
 Republic of Venice
 Ryukyu Kingdom
 Singhasari
 Spanish Empire
 Srivijaya
 Sultanate of Gowa
 Sultanate of Maguindanao
 Sultanate of Sulu
 Sultanate of Ternate
 Sultanate of Tidore
 Swedish Empire
 Tarumanagara
 Tundun Kingdom
 Tungning Kingdom
 Tuʻi Tonga Empire

See also

 Alfred Thayer Mahan
 Archipelagic state
 Blue-water navy
 List of transcontinental countries
 List of former transcontinental countries
 Maritime power
 Naval warfare 
 Nomadic empire

References

External links
 The Fragility of Thalassocracy, Pericles to Heinlein

Coasts
Empires
Forms of government
History of colonialism
History of international trade
History of water transport
Island countries
Maritime history
Maritime republics
Naval history
Sea lanes
Seas